The Brave-class fast patrol boats were a class of two gas turbine motor torpedo boats (MTBs) that were the last of their type for the Royal Navy (RN) Coastal Forces division. They formed the basis for a series of simpler boats which were widely built for export.

At the time of their introduction the Braves were the fastest naval vessels in the world.

Brave class
They were larger than the Dark class, and differed in being powered by gas turbine engines rather than the diesel engines of the Dark class. Like the Dark class, the Braves had a mahogany skin over aluminium frame construction. They were built to be able to be used as either motor torpedo boats or motor gun boats. For the former role they had a 40 mm Bofors gun, four  torpedoes  and two depth charges, in the latter two 40 mm guns and two torpedoes. It was planned to arm the ships with a new  gun based on the 20-pounder tank gun in a stabilised mounting, but this was abandoned.

The Royal Navy abandoned the idea of large scale coastal forces in 1957, so only two Braves were built for the Royal Navy. The two Braves, along with a single member of the Dark class, formed the Coastal Forces Trials and Special Service Squadron, based at Gosport. These were used to maintain proficiency in Coastal Forces operations, also being used as targets and for fishery protection. The two Braves were retired from use in 1970.

Ferocity and derivatives
The Braves were expensive boats, so as a private venture, Vospers produced a simpler derivative, Ferocity. Construction was all wooden to minimise costs. Despite the reduced size and power, performance and armament were similar to the Braves. While Ferocity herself was not sold, it formed the basis for a number of boats for export.

Boats
The two RN craft were both built by Vospers at Portchester:
 , launched on 7 January 1958 and commissioned on 26 January 1960
 , launched 22 May 1958 and commissioned on 20 July 1960

At the end of their life they were sold to the Haydon-Baillie aircraft museum.

HMS Brave Borderer was the subject of an attack by the IRA in 1965. Royal Navy ships had begun to visit Ireland on friendship visits, but Republicans objected to their presence, and members of the IRA's Kilkenny Brigade, led by Richard Behal, determined to make a political point by attacking one of the vessels (it was not their intention to kill any crew). On 10 September 1965, as HMS Brave Borderer was departing Waterford down the River Suir for the sea, she was fired upon using a World War 2-vintage Boys anti-tank rifle which blew two holes in the side of the vessel's stern. The vessel went to full speed and was out of range before any more rounds could be fired; there were no casualties, but the vessel had to return to Vospers for repairs which took several months.

Export

Denmark 

Denmark purchased six Søløven-class fast patrol boats, with the larger hull form and the 3-Proteus powerplant of the Brave class and the wooden construction of Ferocity. Armament consisted of two 40 mm Bofors guns and four torpedoes. The first two boats, Søløven and Søridderen were built by Vospers (with Søløven being paid for by the United States and hence given the nominal US designation PT-821), with the remaining four boats being built under license by the Royal Dockyard, Copenhagen. They were placed into reserve in 1988, and disposed of when the s entered service, with disposal complete by 1992.

One of the Søløven-class boats, apparently in a derelict state, was auctioned in Belgium from 12–24 February 2016, being moored alongside another in Antwerp harbour.

West Germany 

West Germany ordered two fast patrol boats (both designated Type 153) from Vospers on 22 August 1960. The first, Strahl was based on the Brave class, with three Proteus gas turbines, while Pfeil was based on the smaller Ferocity with two Proteus. Armament was the same convertible combination of Bofors 40 mm guns and torpedoes as the Brave class, with the option of replacing the torpedoes with eight mines. They were transferred to Greece in 1967.

Libya 
In October 1966, Libya ordered three fast patrol boats of the Susa class from Vospers based on the Danish Søløven class, with the wooden construction of Ferocity but a larger hull powered by three Proteus engines. Armament consisted of eight SS.12 wire-guided anti-ship missiles and two 40 mm Bofors guns.

Malaysia 
The Royal Malaysian Navy ordered four Perkasa-class fast patrol craft on 22 October 1964 to be designed and built by Vospers. The design was similar to the Danish Søløven class, with a large wooden hull with an aluminium superstructure and powered by three Proteus engines. The original armament was four torpedoes (which could be swapped for 10 mines), a single 40 mm Bofors gun forward and a twin 20 mm Oerlikon cannon mount aft. The four boats were delivered in 1967 and re-armed with eight SS-12 missiles in 1971.
 
KD Perkasa P150
KD Handalan P151
KD Gempita P152
KD Pendekar P153

Brunei 
A single boat of the class was purchased by the Royal Brunei Navy, KDB Pahlawan.

Notes

References
 Blackman, Raymond V. B. Jane's Fighting Ships 1960–61. London: Sampson Low, Marston & Company, 1960.
 Blackman, Raymond V. B. Jane's Fighting Ships 1962–63. London: Sampson Low, Marston & Company, 1962.
 Blackman, Raymond V. B. Jane's Fighting Ships 1971–72. London: Sampson Low, Marston & Company, 1971. .
 Gardiner, Robert and Stephen Chumbley. Conway's All The World's Fighting Ships 1947–1995. Annapolis, Maryland USA: Naval Institute Press, 1995. .
 Prézelin, Bernard and A.D Baker. The Naval Institute Guide to Combat Fleets of the World 1990/91. Annapolis, Maryland, USA: Naval Institute Press, 1990. .

External links

 Brave Class Fast Attack Craft
 British Military Powerboat Trust
 "World's Fastest Fighting Vessel." Popular Science, June 1960, pp. 92–93, detailed cutaway drawings of Brave class.
Soeloeven klassen

Fast attack craft
Patrol boat classes
Patrol vessels of the Royal Navy
Patrol vessels of the United Kingdom
Ship classes of the Royal Navy
Torpedo boats of the Royal Navy